The following is a list of the heads of state of modern Yemen, from the establishment of the Mutawakkilite Kingdom of Yemen in 1918 to the present day.

Yemen is in a tumultuous state since the start of the Arab Spring-related Yemeni Crisis in 2011; the crisis resulted in the resignation of President Ali Abdullah Saleh in 2012, after 33 years in power. The presidency was then transferred to Vice President Abdrabbuh Mansur Hadi. Since 2014–2015, the country has been in a civil war (alongside the Saudi Arabian–led military intervention aimed at restoring Hadi's government after the Houthi takeover) with several proto-state entities claiming to govern Yemen: the internationally recognized Cabinet of Yemen/Presidential Leadership Council, the Houthi-led Supreme Revolutionary Committee/Supreme Political Council, and the secessionist Southern Transitional Council.

Mutawakkilite Kingdom of Yemen (1918–1970)

Mutawakkilite Kingdom of Yemen in Exile (1962–1970)

Yemen Arab Republic (1962–1990)

People's Democratic Republic of Yemen (1967–1990)

Democratic Republic of Yemen (1994)

STC secession attempt (2017–present)

Republic of Yemen (post-unification, 1990–present)

Status

Timeline

See also
Modern history of Yemen
Imams of Yemen
President of the Yemen Arab Republic
List of leaders of South Yemen
President of Yemen

Notes

References

External links
List of Yemeni heads of state and government
World Statesmen – Yemen

Yemen

Heads of state